Wonewoc may refer to:
 Wonewoc, Wisconsin, a village in Juneau County, Wisconsin, United States
 Wonewoc (town), Wisconsin, a town in Juneau County, Wisconsin, United States
 Wonewoc Spiritualist Camp in Juneau County, Wisconsin, United States